The Open Canada Cup was an annual knock-out cup competition in Canadian Soccer. The competition was first held during the 1998 season as the CPSL League Cup. It was organized by the Canadian Soccer League (formerly the Canadian Professional Soccer League) originally as a League Cup for CSL member clubs. After operating the competition for several seasons as an exclusive tournament the league's ownership decided in 2003 to grant accessibility to all Canadian professional and amateur clubs. The decision was influenced by the lack of initiative by the Canadian Soccer Association in providing a potential candidate for the CONCACAF Champions' Cup.

Further reforms consisted of title sponsorship with the Government of Canada and the inclusion of a financial reward for the overall champion.  Subsequently, the tournament managed to attract several notable amateurs, and professional clubs with credentials from the USL First Division, Canadian National Challenge Cup, Ligue de Soccer Elite Quebec, and the Ontario Cup. In 2007, the competition reached its zenith as it expanded westward to include clubs from British Columbia with the inclusion of the champion of the British Columbia Provincial Soccer Championship. In 2008, the prize money was increased, but after the creation of the Canadian Championship, the competition was disbanded. Since the establishment of the Canadian Championship CSL teams has not participated in the tournament which determines the Canadian entry into the CONCACAF Champions League.

Throughout the history of the tournament Canadian Soccer League teams have dominated the competition except for Ottawa St. Anthony Italia in the 2006 season. Toronto Olympians were the most successful club with 3 titles. David Gee is the most successful head coach in the history of the competition, having won three titles as head coach of Toronto Olympians.

Competition format 
Originally the format of the competition was organized into a group stage with the two top teams advancing to the semifinals, and a final match to decide the champion in September. The arrangement of teams for the group stages was determined by the geographical locations of the clubs to accommodate the travel distances. In 2002, the format was revised with the introduction of a qualifying round with a home and away two-game series followed by a quarterfinal, semifinal, and championship final round. While the hosting club was granted a wildcard privilege. When the tournament transitioned into an open cup competition the first round consisted of amateur league clubs. CSL and later USL clubs entered play into the second round.

When the competition expanded westward British Columbia teams held separate qualifying matches through the British Columbia Provincial Soccer Championship. where the champion received a bye into the semifinals. Traditionally the schedule of the tournament revolved around the summer holiday long weekends. The opening round was played around Victoria Day the second round during Canada Day, and the quarterfinals on the Civic Holiday weekend. While the tournament would conclude during the Labour Day long weekend. The matches were generally decided on a one-legged tie that lasted 90 minutes plus any additional stoppage time. Drawn matches went directly to extra time, and if necessary to a penalty shootout.

History 
Historically attempts at organizing a national open cup competition between professional and amateur clubs in Canadian soccer was a concept largely ignored by the national and provincial associations. One such exception is the Challenge Trophy, which continuously operates at a national level but solely for amateur clubs. A tournament was formed by the CSL's predecessor league the National Soccer League (NSL) in the 1986 season known as the NSL Canada Cup which crowned a national league cup champion with the Pacific Rim Soccer League of British Columbia, and the Quebec National Soccer League as participants. The NSL also promoted the NSL Canadian Championship to provide a national champion and a Canadian representative to the CONCACAF Champions' Cup. Proposals were suggested in 1996 by the USL A-League by presenting a trophy to its Canadian franchises to establish a Canadian open cup competition, but the idea failed to materialize.

In 1998, the Canadian National Soccer League and the Ontario Soccer Association collaborated to form the Canadian Professional Soccer League (CPSL) an attempt to form a national league. Initially, the CPSL ran a league cup known as the CPSL League Cup but was restricted to member clubs. Shortly after the tournament attracted sponsorship deals from Primus Canada, and in 2001 received a title sponsor from Oz Optics Ltd. In the initial years, the league cup was dominated by the Toronto Olympians, which later was assumed by the heavily invested Ottawa Wizards.

In 2002, the competition received financial aid from the Canadian government in the form of a federal grant with intentions to promote the tournament across the country. As a result, the league began to take the initiative of providing a potential candidate for the CONCACAF Champions' Cup as the Canadian Soccer Association and other provincial governing bodies neglected in organizing an open cup tournament. The previous time a Canadian club competed in the Champions' Cup was in the 1976 CONCACAF Champions' Cup represented by Toronto Italia of the National Soccer League. In 2003, the CPSL opened their league cup to all Canadian professional and amateur clubs with the intent of providing the potential Canadian candidate to the continental tournament. The competition was renamed the Open Canada Cup with the government of Canada as the initial title sponsor, and the inclusion of a $10,000 reward for the champion.

As the restrictions on eligibility were lifted for the 2003 Open Canada Cup the tournament managed to entice clubs from the Ontario Soccer League, Ottawa Carleton Soccer League, Western Ontario Soccer League, and the Ligue de Soccer Elite Quebec to participate. The competition was won by London City in a penalty shootout against the Metro Lions played at Cove Road Stadium, London, Ontario. Despite the CPSL's successful attempt at organizing an open cup tournament, the competition was not without controversy. The controversy stemmed from a dispute involving Ottawa Wizards with the CPSL's board of directors over the hosting rights for the finals. After failing to confirm their participation in the later rounds of the tournament the league removed Ottawa from the competition, and in return, Ottawa threatened to obtain an injunction. The dispute eventually reached the Superior Court of Justice which ruled in favor of the CPSL decision and allowed the tournament to proceed without the participation of Ottawa.

The tournament continued to expand, and in 2004 attracted a record amount of 24 participants throughout Ontario. It would grow to include clubs with Challenge Cup, and Ontario Cup honors. Meanwhile, the on-field performance was dominated by the Windsor Border Stars with consecutive championships from 2004 to 2005. In 2006, the competition reached a new milestone as it managed to draw the attention of the Toronto Lynx of the USL First Division, the country's top-tier league. The 2006 edition made headlines as Ottawa St. Anthony Italia became the first amateur club to claim the championship after defeating the Toronto Lynx in the finals. The tournament reached its apex in 2007 as it broaden to include professional and amateur teams from British Columbia, Ontario, and Quebec. Trois-Rivières Attak became the first Quebec champion in 2007 after defeating Columbus Clan F.C.

In 2008, the CSL increased the prize money to $25,000 with the top amateur club receiving $10,000, but shortly after the creation of the Canadian Championship the competition was disbanded.

Finals

Performance by Club

References

 
Canada
Soccer cup competitions in Canada
Canadian Soccer League (1998–present)
1998 establishments in Canada
2007 disestablishments in Canada
Recurring sporting events established in 1998
Recurring sporting events disestablished in 2007